Amilton may refer to:
Amilton Prado (born 1979), Peruvian football defender
Amílton (footballer, born 1981), Brazilian football striker
Amilton (footballer, born 1989), Brazilian football right winger
Amilton Filho (born 1992), Belizean football midfielder

See also
Hamilton (name)

Masculine given names